The 2015 CBR Brave season was the Brave's 2nd season in the Australian Ice Hockey League since being founded and entering the league in 2014. The season ran from 25 April 2015 to 29 August 2015 for the Brave. CBR finished fourth in the regular season behind the Newcastle North Stars, Melbourne Ice and Perth Thunder. The Brave qualified for the AIHL Finals in Melbourne and played in semi-final one. Canberra were defeated by league premiers, the Newcastle North Stars, 3–4 in their semi-final match and were knocked out of the finals weekend, ending their season.

News

In January 2015, the Brave announced the appointment of Brad Hunt as the new head coach of the team for the 2015 AIHL season. Brad was originally going to take on the assistant coach role for 2015 after hanging up the skates at the end of the 2014 season but with former head coach Matti Louma leaving the club to take on a development coaching position in Perth, Hunt was promoted to head coach instead.

In February 2015, the league commission announced scheduling changes for the 2015 season that saw the Sydney Ice Dogs and Sydney Bears move three home matches from Sydney to Canberra.

In March 2015, the CBR Brave in conjunction with Ice Hockey ACT announced the formation of the Junior Brave team to compete in the 2015 NSW Midget League. The junior program was coached by former AIHL player and Australian representative Andrew Brunt and finished their first season by finishing second in the league and losing the grand final to defending champions, the Liverpool Saints, 3–1. Three of the Junior Brave players made their debut with the senior CBR Brave team in the AIHL during 2015, including: goalie Alexandre Tetrault and forwards Jayden Lewis and Jordan Brunt. Alexandre Tetrault was also selected to represent Australia in the Under 20 World Championships in Serbia in 2016.

In July 2015, the CBR Brave and head coach Brad Hunt parted ways by mutual consent. On ice performances during the first half of the regular season and future planning were cited as the main reasons for the decision. Import goaltender, Josh Unice, was appointed interim head coach for the remainder of the season. Alternative captain, Aaron Clayworth, retired from playing and stepped in to take over as assistant coach for the remainder of the season.

Roster

Team roster for the 2015 AIHL season

Transfers

All the player transfers in and out by the CBR Brave for the 2015 AIHL season.

In

Out

Staff

Staff Roster for 2015 AIHL season

Standings

Regular season

Summary

Position by round

League table

1The Ice Dogs were fined three competition points for multiple breaches by-law 4 which requires teams to travel with at least 15 players unless an exemption has been granted.

Source

Finals

Summary

Bracket

Schedule & results

Regular season

Finals
Goodall Cup semi-final
All times are UTC+10:00

Player statistics

Skaters

Goaltenders

Awards

References

CBR Brave seasons